Sir Maurice Alan Cassidy GCVO CB (29 February 1880 – 22 October 1949) was a British medical doctor, physician to the King from 1937 until his own death.

Maurice was born the eldest son of David McKay Cassidy, a doctor at the Lancaster Mental Hospital in Lancashire and was educated at Lancaster Royal Grammar School and Clare College, Cambridge. He then entered St Thomas' Hospital in London as a medical student, qualifying M.B. in 1906 and M.D. in 1909.

After working there for several years, including two as Resident Assistant Registrar, he was elected in 1913 a Fellow of the Royal College of Surgeons and joined the honorary staff of St Thomas'. In 1914 he delivered the Goulstonian Lecture to the College of Surgeons on the subject of rheumatoid arthritis.

During the First World War he spent two years in a Calais hospital, where he contracted pulmonary tuberculosis and had to be repatriated. In addition to his commitments at St Thomas' he was for some time Chief Medical Officer to the Metropolitan Police and was knighted C.B. on his retirement from the post in 1929.

Although he had withdrawn from active duty at St Thomas' prior to the Second World War he nevertheless returned to duty for the duration of the war, retiring finally in 1945. He delivered the Harveian Oration to the Royal College of Physicians in 1946 on the subject of coronary disease. From 1946 to 1948 he served as president of the Royal Society of Medicine.

In 1930 he had been appointed Physician to the Royal Household, and later Physician in ordinary to both King George V and King George VI. He was created first K.C.V.O. and then G.C.V.O.

He died at his home in London in 1949 following a car accident. He had married Elsie, daughter of Frederick Relfe but left no children.

References 

1880 births
1949 deaths
People from Lancaster, Lancashire
Alumni of Clare College, Cambridge
20th-century English medical doctors
Presidents of the Royal Society of Medicine